The Simulmatics Corporation was a U.S. data science firm founded in 1959 that used algorithms to target voters and consumers. One of its leading figures was Ithiel de Sola Pool.

Professor of American History at Harvard University Jill Lepore wrote a book about the Simulmatics Corporation, titled If Then, in 2020, and recorded an audio version broadcast by BBC Radio 4 in 2021.

The political novel The 480 contains a fictional treatment of the Simulmatics Corporation's activities.

References

See also 
 Cambridge Analytica

Political campaign techniques